

Events
1 January – Australia's first Digital commercial free-to-air channel, Tasmanian Digital Television begins broadcasting in Hobart as a supplementary broadcaster to existing broadcasters Southern Cross Tasmania & WIN Television. On the same day, WIN TEN goes on air in the Mount Gambier & Riverland regions of South Australia as a supplementary broadcaster to existing solus broadcaster WIN Television.
February – Nine launches a new afternoon news service to complete against Seven's 4:30 pm news, which was launched the previous year to provide viewers with up-to-date information on the War on Iraq.
1 February – Deal or No Deal debuts its 5.30pm timeslot on Seven which would last until 2015. This proves to be a massive ratings hit, leading into Seven's 6pm news bulletin. Its success proves too much for the Nine Network, with reworked game shows including The Price is Right, Bert's Family Feud and Million Dollar Wheel of Fortune all failing in the dreaded 5:30pm timeslot until Hot Seat's arrival in 2009.
2 February – Top-rating game show Wheel of Fortune makes a rebranding and a super new-look over to continue its long-run. Also, Steve Oemcke takes over from Rob Elliott as the show's final original main host.
14 March – Foxtel launches its new digital service, Foxtel Digital.
18 April - Rove McManus wins the 2004 TV WEEK Gold Logie.
21 April - A live episode of Blue Heelers goes to air on the Seven Network, titled "Reasonable Doubt". Although this particular episode earned reasonable ratings, peaking with 693,000 viewers in Melbourne, the rest of the season is a failure ratings-wise.
30 April – The final episode of Burgo's Catch Phrase goes to air on the Nine Network after a 4-year run then a 2-year run.
1 May – Network Ten breaks with years of tradition and abandons the Sunday night movie after poor ratings. Instead, it screens episodes of Law and Order: Criminal Intent. Most other networks follow suit later on.
12 May – After 18 years at SBS, Margaret Pomeranz and David Stratton resign from the station to move to the ABC to present a new program, At the Movies. Four younger presenters replace them on The Movie Show: Megan Spencer, Fenella Kernebone and Jaimie Leonarder, with Marc Fennell presenting a segment on newly released DVDs.
17 June, 5:58pm – Dean Cartechini becomes the first person to win Deal or No Deal'''s top prize, winning $200,000.
28 June – The Price is Right moves to the 5:00 pm timeslot on the Nine Network and the show extends to one hour.
26 July – Broken Hill resident Trevor Butler proposes to his girlfriend immediately after winning A$1,000,000 on Big Brother.
13 August – After a short-lived return at its new 11:30 am timeslot, Ten axes vintage Neighbours episodes again after more very bad ratings.
16 August – Ten extends its morning news into a one-hour format.
29 August – The Nine Network undergoes a major revamp to change their on-air graphics with a Helvetica font, featuring the 2004 to 2006 theme “Still the One” which lasted until 29 January 2006.
30 August – Immediately after the closing ceremony of the Athens Olympics, the first ever Sunrise is broadcast from the Seven Network's new Martin Place studios. On the same night, Seven News relaunches nationwide with a complete overhaul of graphics, a new musical theme (unchanged until 1 February 2016) and a new set in Sydney. Nine News counters by introducing live CBD backdrops on its Sydney and Brisbane bulletins.
12 September – The 2001 war film Behind Enemy Lines starring Owen Wilson and Gene Hackman premieres on the Seven Network.
4 October – British long running children's animated series Peppa Pig debuts on ABC.
5 October – After a five-year absence, Daryl Somers returns to television to host a brand new series on Seven Network called Dancing with the Stars based on the American light entertainment reality series of the same name.
13 October – The Australian version of Border Security premieres on the Seven Network and is shown every Wednesday at 9:30 pm.
21 November – 16-year-old Casey Donovan wins the second series of Australian Idol defeating 21-year-old favourite, Anthony Callea. Her debut single "Listen with Your Heart" reaches number one in the ARIA Charts in December 2004.
23 November – Home and Away actress Bec Cartwright and her partner Michael Miziner are crowned season champions as the first season of Dancing with the Stars reaches its grand final.
11 December – The Network Ten is the next Australian television network to introduce a watermark on its programs, although the watermark is now broadcast on Ten News. It was located on the bottom left of the screens before switching to bottom right in 2006.
14 December – The final episode of Stingers goes to air on the Nine Network and the show was axed after six years.
23 December – American animated science fiction sitcom Futurama created by Matt Groening the creator of The Simpsons airs on the Seven Network for the last time before changing broadcasts to Network Ten which won't happen until the end of next year.
December – Seven, Nine & TEN withdrawn their opening to movies - movie openers are replaced by classification boards instead.Wheel of Fortune's attempt for a major revamp backfires and is quietly cancelled due to low ratings - leaving Deal or No Deal the absolute only game show remaining, leading into Seven's 6pm news bulletin.
December – The Nine Network claims the ratings season for the fourth consecutive year, winning 38 out of 40 weeks, while Network Ten (which wins the other two weeks) finishes ahead of the Seven Network nationally for the first time.

Debuts

Pay TV

New International Programming

Subscription Television

Specials

 Programming Changes 

Changes to network affiliation

This is a list of programs which made their premiere on an Australian television network that had previously premiered on another Australian television network. The networks involved in the switch of allegiances are predominantly both free-to-air networks or both subscription television networks. Programs that have their free-to-air/subscription television premiere, after previously premiering on the opposite platform (free-to air to subscription/subscription to free-to air) are not included. In some cases, programs may still air on the original television network. This occurs predominantly with programs shared between subscription television networks.

International

Subscription premieres
This is a list of programs which made their premiere on Australian subscription television that had previously premiered on Australian free-to-air television. Programs may still air on the original free-to-air television network.

International

Television shows

ABC
 Four Corners (1961–present)
 The Fat (2000–2003)
 Kath & Kim (2002–2005, 2007)
 The Glass House (2001–2006)

Seven Network
 Wheel of Fortune (1981–1996, 1996–2003, 2004–present)
 Sunrise (1991–1998, 2003–present)
 Home and Away (1988–2005, 2005–present)
 Blue Heelers (1994–2006)
 Today Tonight (1995–present)
 All Saints (1998–present)
 Ground Force (1999–2004)
 AMV (2000–present)
 The Big Arvo (2001–2004)
 Deal or No Deal (2003, 2004–present)

Nine Network
 Sale of the Century (1980–2001)
 A Current Affair (1971–1978, 1988–2005, 2006–present)
 Today (1982–present)
 Australia's Funniest Home Video Show (1990–2000, 2000–2004, 2005–present)
 The AFL Footy Show (1994–present)
 The NRL Footy Show (1994–present)
 Burgo's Catch Phrase (1997–2004)
 Who Wants to Be a Millionaire? (1999–2006, 2007–present)
 Backyard Blitz (2000–2007)
 McLeod's Daughters (2001–present)
 Merrick & Rosso Unplanned (2003–2004)
 The Block (2003–2004)

Network Ten
 Neighbours (1985–1989, 1989–present)
 Good Morning Australia (1991–2005)
 Rove Live (2000–2006)
 Australian Idol'' (2003–present)

Ending / Resting this year

Revamping this year

TV movies

Miniseries

See also
 2004 in Australia
 List of Australian films of 2004

References